The 1987 Scott Tournament of Hearts, the Canadian women's curling championship, was held from February 28 to March 7, 1987 at the Lethbridge Sportsplex in Lethbridge, Alberta.

Team British Columbia, who was skipped by Pat Sanders won the event after defeating Manitoba in the final 9–3 in nine ends. BC advanced to the final after defeating Quebec in the semifinal 10–6. This was BC's sixth championship and the only title skipped by Sanders.

Sanders' rink would represent Canada at the 1987 World Women's Curling Championship held in Chicago, Illinois, USA, where they won Canada's fourth straight world championship.

Teams
The teams were listed as follows:

Round Robin standings
Final Round Robin standings

Round Robin results
All draw times are listed in Mountain Standard Time (UTC-07:00).

Draw 1
Saturday, February 28, 1:00 pm

Draw 2
Saturday, February 28, 6:30 pm

Draw 3
Sunday, March 1, 1:00 pm

Draw 4
Sunday, March 1, 6:30 pm

Draw 5
Monday, March 2, 8:30 am

Draw 6
Monday, March 2, 1:00 pm

Draw 7
Monday, March 2, 6:30 pm

Draw 8
Tuesday, March 3, 8:30 am

Draw 9
Tuesday, March 3, 1:00 pm

Draw 10
Tuesday, March 3, 6:30 pm

Draw 11
Wednesday, March 4, 8:30 am

Draw 12
Wednesday, March 4, 1:00 pm

Draw 13
Wednesday, March 4, 6:30 pm

Draw 14
Thursday, March 5, 1:00 pm

Draw 15
Thursday, March 5, 6:30 pm

Tiebreakers

Round 1
Friday, March 6, 8:30 am

Round 2
Friday, March 6, 1:00 pm

Playoffs

Semifinal
Friday, March 6, 6:30 pm

Final
Saturday, March 7, 11:00 am

Statistics

Top 5 player percentages
Final Round Robin Percentages

Awards
The all-star team and sportsmanship award winners were as follows:

All-Star Team

Myrna McQuarrie Award 
The Scotties Tournament of Hearts Sportsmanship Award is presented to the curler who best embodies the spirit of curling at the Scotties Tournament of Hearts. The winner was selected in a vote by all players at the tournament. 

Prior to 1998, the award was named after a notable individual in the curling community where the tournament was held that year.

Notes

References

Scotties Tournament of Hearts
Scott Tournament of Hearts
Scott Tournament Of Hearts, 1987
Sport in Lethbridge
Curling competitions in Alberta
1987 in women's curling
February 1987 sports events in Canada
March 1987 sports events in Canada